This is a list of recreational organizations.

International 
 Royal Family Kids' Camps
 Toastmasters International
 YMCA
 YWCA

United States 
 American Bowling Congress
 American Camp Association
 Sierra Club

Lists of organizations